Sele pri Polskavi is a settlement in the Municipality of Slovenska Bistrica in northeastern Slovenia. It lies between Zgornja Polskava and Spodnja Polskava. The area is part of the traditional region of Styria. It is now included with the rest of the municipality in the Drava Statistical Region.

Name
The name of the settlement was changed from Sele to Sele pri Polskavi in 1955.

References

External links
Sele pri Polskavi at Geopedia

Populated places in the Municipality of Slovenska Bistrica